Madhuca endertii is a plant in the family Sapotaceae.

Description
Inflorescences bear up to three flowers.

Distribution and habitat
Madhuca endertii is endemic to Borneo. Its habitat is montane forests from  altitude.

Conservation
Madhuca endertii has been assessed as vulnerable on the IUCN Red List. The species is threatened by logging and conversion of land for palm oil plantations.

References

endertii
Endemic flora of Borneo
Trees of Borneo
Plants described in 1927